Sebedražie is a village and municipality in Prievidza District in the Trenčín Region of western Slovakia.

History
In historical records the village was first mentioned in 1245.
The village is also known as džungoro.

Geography
The municipality lies at an altitude of 337 metres and covers an area of 8.439 km2. It has a population of about 1,726 people.

References

External links
http://www.sebedrazie.sk

Villages and municipalities in Prievidza District